Terminalia sericea is a species of deciduous tree of the genus Terminalia that is native to southern Africa. Its common names include clusterleaf, silver cluster-leaf or silver terminalia in English, vaalboom in Afrikaans and mususu in Venda.

Etymology
The generic name is derived from the Latin terminus meaning "boundary" and describes the concentration of the foliage at the very end of the twigs. The specific name "sericea" comes from the Latin sericatus meaning "clothed in silken hair" and describes the downy foliage.

Description
The bark is a reddish or greyish brown colour and peels away in strips. The bluish-green leaves tend to be clustered at the tips of the branches. They are ovate with entire margins and both the upper and lower surfaces are clothed in silvery hairs. The flowers are white and are borne in short axilliary spikes. They have an unpleasant smell and may be pollinated by flies. The fruit are winged nuts containing a single seed and turn a darker pink colour as they ripen. They may remain attached to the branch for a year and are dispersed by the wind. They sometimes become contorted and hairy as a result of the activities of parasitic insect larvae.

Distribution and habitat
The silver cluster-leaf is endemic to Africa from Tanzania and the Democratic Republic of Congo southwards to South Africa. It grows in open mixed woodland on sandy soils. It is often found growing with miombo (Brachystegia spp.), mopane (Colophospermum mopane), Acacia spp. and bush willows (Combretum spp.). It is often one of the dominant species in mixed woodland.

Requirements
 
The silver cluster-leaf grows readily from seed. It is a pioneer species, easily becoming established in previously unwooded areas and may form dense shrubby thickets. It is tolerant of waterlogged soils and of drought conditions and fairly tolerant of saline soils. It needs full light to grow well and tends to shade out weeds so its presence helps climax species to become established. It has been used in land improvement and to control erosion. The leaves are shed in autumn and flowering takes place after the rainy season has started and the new foliage developed. Flowering may be reduced after a bush fire.

Uses
The timber of the silver cluster-leaf is yellow and hard-grained and is resistant to attack by wood-boring insects and termites. It is used in building construction and to make tool handles, furniture and fencing posts. It is used for firewood and the making of charcoal. The bark has been used to make ropes and is also pounded to produce a substance for waterproofing boats. The leaves are eaten by cattle during the dry season when grass becomes unavailable.

In traditional medicine, both leaves and roots have been used as a remedy for stomach ailments and a concoction of the roots for treating bilharzia, diarrhoea and pneumonia. The bark is used against diabetes and to dress wounds.

References

sericea
Flora of Africa